The 2015–16 CEV Champions League was the 57th edition of the highest level European volleyball club competition organised by the European Volleyball Confederation.

Participating teams

Format

League round
28 teams have been drawn to 7 pools of 4 teams each.

In each pool, the competition is organised on the basis of a double round-robin system. Each team will thus play 6 matches: twice against each opponent.

In the League Round, the placing of the teams is determined by the number of matches won.

In case of a tie in the number of matches won by two or more teams, they will be ranked on the basis of the following criteria:
match points;
set quotient (the number of total sets won divided by the number of total sets lost);
points quotient (the number of total points scored divided by the number of total points lost);
results of head-to-head matches between the teams in question.

Match points are awarded as follows:
3 points for a 3:0 or 3:1 victory;
2 points for a 3:2 victory;
1 point for a 2:3 defeat;
0 points for a 1:3 or 0:3 defeat.

12 teams will qualify for the Playoff 12:
the winner of each pool, and
5 second-ranked teams with the best score.

After the end of the League Round, the organizer of the Final Four will be determined. That team will qualify directly for the Final Four. It will be replaced in Playoff 12 by the next best second-ranked team.

The remaining second-ranked team as well 3 third-ranked teams with the best score will move to the Challenge Round of the CEV Cup.

The remaining third-ranked and all fourth-ranked teams will be eliminated.

Playoffs
The playoffs will consist of two rounds: Playoff 12 and Playoff 6. Each round is played in two legs.

If the teams are tied after two legs, a "Golden Set" is played. The winner is the team that first obtains 15 points, provided that the points difference between the two teams is at least 2 points (thus, the Golden Set is similar to a tiebreak set in a normal match).

At each leg, points are awarded to the teams in the same manner as in the Group Round (3 for 3:0 or 3:1, 2 for 3:2 etc.). So, if team A defeat team B in the first leg 3:0 and lose in the second leg 1:3, team A does not advance to the next round (as it would have been expected on the basis of analogy with football competitions), but the two teams are tied with 3 points each, and a Golden Set is played.

The three teams that win in Playoff 6 round advance to the Final Four along with the organizer of the Final Four.

Pools composition
The drawing of lots was held in Vienna, Austria on 2 July 2015. The 28 participated teams of the competition were divided by 4 pots based on the latest European Cups Ranking List and their National Rankings. Exception, the teams which received wild cards had to be in the 4th pot.

League round

All times are local.

Pool A

|}

|}

Pool B

|}

|}

Pool C

|}

|}

Pool D

|}

|}

Pool E

|}

|}

Pool F

|}

|}

Pool G

|}

|}

Second and third place ranking
The first 7 teams are 2nd placed teams. The other teams are 3rd placed teams. 

|}

Playoffs

All times are local.

Playoff 12

|}

First leg

|}

Second leg

|}

Playoff 6

|}

First leg

|}

Second leg

|}

Final Four
Organizer:  Asseco Resovia
 Place: Kraków
All times are Central European Summer Time (UTC+02:00).

Semifinals

|}

3rd place match

|}

Final

|}

Final standings

Awards

Most Valuable Player
  Wilfredo León (Zenit Kazan)
Best Setter
  Simone Giannelli (Diatec Trentino)
Best Outside Spikers
  Tine Urnaut (Diatec Trentino)
  Wilfredo León (Zenit Kazan)

Best Middle Blockers
  Sebastián Solé (Diatec Trentino)
  Russell Holmes (Asseco Resovia)
Best Opposite Spiker
  Maxim Mikhaylov (Zenit Kazan)
Best Libero
  Jenia Grebennikov (Cucine Lube Civitanova)

References

External links
 2016 CEV DenizBank Volleyball Champions League

CEV Champions League
2015 in volleyball
2016 in volleyball